Ahmadabad-e Koleybi (also Romanized as Aḩmadābād-e Koleybī; also known as Aḩmadābād) is a village in Howmeh Rural District, in the Central District of Minab County, Hormozgan Province, Iran. At the 2006 census, its population was 169, in 31 families.

References 

Populated places in Minab County